Ruth Jean MacTammany (1892 – 1977), also known as Jeanne Iver and Ruth Rishel, was an actress, singer, and screenwriter from the United States. She had film roles and a film company was named for her.

She was in the 1919 theatrical production The Lady in Red (Broadway show). She was performing in Europe when World War I broke out. She was arrested as a spy but was released and served as an ambulance driver.

Early life
She was born in Akron, Ohio.

Wartime, marriage, and lawsuit
Her wartime experiences were related in newspapers. She married twice.

In a lawsuit she testified that she performed at the Tangier Club, owned by her husband and his family, and that it was a reputable club.

Filmography
Alma, Where Do You Live? (1917), she wrote the screen adaptation for the film from the play
One Day (1917 film) 
The Girl From Rectors (1917)
Where Do You Live? (1917)

References

American stage actresses
Actresses from Akron, Ohio
20th-century American actresses
1892 births
1977 deaths
American film actresses
Writers from Akron, Ohio
American women screenwriters
20th-century American women writers
20th-century American women singers
Screenwriters from Ohio
20th-century American screenwriters
20th-century American singers